Billionaire Boys Club (BBC) is a streetwear label founded by Pharrell Williams and Nigo in 2003. Its sublabels include Ice Cream, Bee Line, and Billionaire Girls Club.

History
In 2003, singer Pharrell Williams and his manager Rob Walker partnered with fashion designer and A Bathing Ape creator Nigo, and Japanese graphic designer, Sk8thing to create Billionaire Boys Club. The brand is credited with helping popularize streetwear's visibility in high fashion.

BBC debuted in Williams' 2003 "Frontin'" music video. In 2004, Ice Cream, originally a subsidiary of Billionaire Boys Club, unveiled its skate-centric footwear line, licensed by Reebok. Ice Cream graphics feature all-over print motifs of beepers, dollar signs and diamonds. A year later, Billionaire Boys Club branched out from its online origin, setting up a store in Tokyo, Japan and later expanding to New York and London.

In August 2011 rapper Jay-Z, a frequent collaborator of Williams, partnered with the Billionaire Boys Club line. Later the rapper, through a joint venture with Iconix, invested in the brand. The following year BBC recorded high $25 million to $30 million in volume, up from $12 million. Williams reacquired Iconix's stake in the business in 2017.

BBC has several sublabels, including Billionaire Girls Club for the female consumer and Bee Line, a collaboration with Mark McNairy.

Locations
Billionaire Boys Club has a US flagship store in SoHo, New York City, a European flagship store in Soho, London, and a store in Tokyo, Japan. Several stores that retail Billionaire Boys Club and Ice Cream clothing exist across North America, Europe, Asia and the Middle East.

See also
Anti Social Social Club
Highsnobiety
Ronnie Fieg
Virgil Abloh
OVO
Chrome Hearts
The Hundreds
Freshjive
Stüssy
Visvim
Complex Magazine 
Supreme

References

External links
 

Clothing retailers of Japan
Clothing retailers of the United States
Hip hop fashion
Clothing brands of Japan
Clothing brands of the United States
Clothing companies based in New York City
Retail companies based in Tokyo
Clothing companies established in 2005
Retail companies established in 2005
2005 establishments in New York City
2005 establishments in Japan
Pharrell Williams
Jay-Z
2000s fashion